RCS-4, or 1-pentyl-3-(4-methoxybenzoyl)indole, is a synthetic cannabinoid drug sold under the names SR-19, BTM-4, or Eric-4 (later shortened to E-4), but originally, OBT-199.

Pharmacology
RCS-4 is a potent cannabinoid receptor agonist, with  EC50 values of 146 nM for human CB1 receptors, and 46 nM for human CB2 receptors. All methoxyphenyl regioisomers, and N-butyl homologues of RCS-4 and its regioisomers also display potent agonist activities at CB1 and CB2 receptors.

Legality
RCS-4 was banned in Sweden on 1 October 2010 as a hazardous good harmful to health, after being identified as an ingredient in "herbal" synthetic cannabis products.

It was outlawed in Denmark on 11 March 2011. 

In August 2011, New Zealand added not only RCS-4 but also its 1-butyl homologue, and the 2-methoxybenzoyl isomers of both these compounds, to a temporary class drug schedule (i.e. equivalent to Class C but reviewed after 12 months, and with personal possession and use of small amounts decriminalised), which was newly created under the Misuse of Drugs Amendment Act 2011 passed a week earlier.

As of October 2015 RCS-4 is a controlled substance in China.

See also 
AM-630
AM-679
RCS-8
Pravadoline (WIN 48,098)
Structural scheduling of synthetic cannabinoids

References 

Benzoylindoles
Designer drugs